Marie of France (18 September 1344 – 15 October 1404) was the sixth child and second daughter of John II of France and Bonne of Bohemia.

Marriage and issue
In 1364, Marie married Robert I, Duke of Bar. Marie had an extensive library and obtained works about a variety of topics. She read romances and poetry, but also works about history and theology. Jean d'Arras dedicated his Roman de Mélusine to Marie.

Marie and Robert I were parents to eleven children:
Charles of Bar (d. 1392)
Henry of Bar (d. October 1397) in Treviso, Italy, of the plague; married Marie de Coucy, Countess of Soissons
Philip of Bar (d. 25 September 1396), killed at the Battle of Nicopolis
Edward III, Duke of Bar (d. 25 October 1415), killed at the Battle of Agincourt
John of Bar (d. 25 October 1415), killed at the Battle of Agincourt
Louis, Duke of Bar (d. 1431). Bishop of Verdun and bishop of Chalon, later a Cardinal. He was childless and his designated heir and eventual successor was René I of Naples.
Marie of Bar, married William II, Marquis of Namur in 1384
Yolande of Bar (c. 1365 - 1431), married John I of Aragon in 1384
Bonne of Bar, married Waleran III of Luxembourg, Count of Ligny in 1393
Joanna of Bar (d. 15 January 1402, married Theodore II, Marquess of Montferrat in 1393
Yolande the Younger of Bar, named after older sister for uncertain reasons, married Adolf, Duke of Jülich-Berg

Notes

External links
A pedigree of the Dukes of Bar

French princesses
House of Valois
People from Saint-Germain-en-Laye
1344 births
1404 deaths
14th-century French people
14th-century French women
15th-century French nobility
15th-century French women
15th-century French people
Daughters of kings